Ivan Dryer (March 7, 1939 - July 27, 2017) is generally considered to be the father of the commercial laser light show industry. He is the founder of the world's first continuously running laser entertainment, known as Laserium.

Dryer was a filmmaker in the early 1970s. On one project, he worked with Dr. Elsa Garmire, a California Institute of Technology physicist interested in laser light art. (She had previously worked with other artists on special event laser shows.) Dryer was disappointed because the resulting film, LaserImage, did not have the pure colors and shimmer of laser light. Dryer realized that it was possible only to capture the special beauty of laser light by using the light itself, not in film or video form.

Dryer had the idea of bringing the Caltech laser to Los Angeles' Griffith Observatory. He, Garmire and Dale Pelton formed Laser Images, Inc. to create Laserium laser light shows to be presented in planetariums. ("Laserium" is not a generic term; it is a registered trademark for the company's laser light shows.)

The first Laserium show opened to the public on November 19, 1973. It is thought to be the first on-going laser show  that was not part of a special or one-time event. The Laserium shows inspired other companies and individuals to create laser shows and displays. Laser imagery spread from planetariums to become more common at other venues such as concerts and corporate shows.

Laserium brand laser shows went on to be played in 46 cities in North America, including Los Angeles, San Francisco, San Diego, New York, Miami, Denver, St. Louis, Seattle, Vancouver, and Toronto. The shows were viewed by over 20 million people. According to the company, Laserium was the longest running theatrical attraction in the history of Los Angeles. The Los Angeles show continued until 2002, a run of 28 years. Laserium continues today in special events and on tour.

In 1989, Dryer received the first ILDA Career Achievement Award from the International Laser Display Association. Dryer's company Laser Images won 43 ILDA Awards for artistic and technical excellence, in the years between 1988 and 2000. Dryer also served as ILDA's president from November 1990 to November 1992.

In 2013, Dryer received the first IMERSA Lifetime Achievement Award from the Immersive Media Entertainment, Research, Science and Arts association. IMERSA noted “In addition to his pioneering creative and technical achievement, he also did something unprecedented for planetariums and science centers: Laserium showed that these facilities could be used as entertainment venues, increasing attendance and generating revenue…. Dryer’s influence carries on with presentations where light becomes an actor.”

In his IMERSA acceptance speech, Dryer recounted the history of his laser work, with many humorous anecdotes. He concluded by saying “I’m delighted that we managed to enlist what was then a somewhat esoteric technological device that has been used to guide missiles and telescopes, to instead guide the neurons in millions of brains to dance synesthetically in a fusion of music and image that enhances both -- to create a machinery of joy. The compliment I most prize was from a woman who came up to me and said, ‘You know, I envy you, you’re spreading joy!’”

In 2017, ILDA declared Dryer's birthdate, March 7, to be an annual event called "International Laserist Day".

References

 
 
 
 
 
 
 

Specific

External links
 ILDA Career Achievement Award citation
 Dryer's IMERSA acceptance speech, with a detailed history of Laserium
 Dryer describes how Laserium started and the future of laser shows
 How Laserium works - video explanation of the laser-projected images
 Laserium home page

Visual music artists
Laser art
1939 births
2017 deaths